People is the fourth studio album of South Korean music producer Code Kunst. It was released through AOMG on April 2, 2020. It later peaked at number 10 on the Gaon Album Chart.

Background 
In an interview with Elle Korea, Code Kunst said that he wanted to share gratitude and happiness with others through the album.

Music and lyrics 
Taking up the theme of various emotions people feel, Code Kunst unfolds the narrative of the album. He compares people to the appearance and symbolism of flowers in "Flower" and expresses his frustration with superficial relationships in "F(ucked up)". He concludes the album with "People" which encourages listeners to continue to trust people.

Critical reception 
Roh Tae-yang of IZM rated the album 3.5 out of 5 stars. He noted that Code Kunst was liberated from auteurism to some extent when he made it. He concluded that it is a "warm-hearted explanation" about the direction of his present and future works although it may not be original.

Lee Jin-seok of Rhythmer rated the album 3.5 out of 5 stars. He wrote that it is a "convincing" work with solid structure and content that sticks to the intention of it although it is not an album that is unique or original.

Critics of Music Y rated "Flower" 4 out of 5 stars. Yeolsimhi called it a "masterpiece" that Code Kunst at this time can make. Yoo Seong-eun wrote that it shows the worries of a producer living in the same era as us although it may not satisfy people who expected a song with a more popular appeal.

Track listing

Charts

Sales

References 

2020 albums
AOMG albums
Hip hop albums by South Korean artists